Changing All the Time is the second studio album by the English rock band Smokie, released in September 1975.

Early pressings of the album had been made with the original band's name "Smokey", but in November 1975 it was announced that the name would be altered to "Smokie" in order to avoid confusion with soul legend Smokey Robinson. All later copies of the album would bear the changed spelling.

Track listing

Personnel
Credits are adapted from the album's 1975 and 2016 liner notes.
Smokie
Chris Norman – lead vocals, back vocals, acoustic guitar, electric guitar, piano
Alan Silson – lead guitar, acoustic guitar, steel guitar, back vocals, lead vocals (on "Give It to Me")
Terry Uttley – bass guitar, back vocals
Pete Spencer – drums, flute, percussion

Technical personnel
Mike Chapman – production
Nicky Chinn – production
Pete Coleman – engineering
Chris Blair – mastering (at Abbey Road Studios, London, England)
Phil Dennys – string arrangements (on tracks 1, 2 and 6)
Michael Ross – sleeve design
Gered Mankowitz – photography
Dick Ward – tinting

Remastering
Tim Turan at Turan Audio – 2007 remastering
MM Sound Digital Mastering Studios – 2016 remastering

Charts

Certifications

References
Notes

Citations

External links
Discography 1975-1982

Smokie (band) albums
1975 albums
Rak Records albums
Albums produced by Mike Chapman